Ophiusa verecunda  is a moth of the family Erebidae. It is found in Africa, including Gabon.

Subspecies
Ophiusa verecunda verecunda
Ophiusa verecunda verecundoides

References

Ophiusa
Fauna of Gabon
Moths of Africa
Moths described in 1894